The Gotlandic official football team is the official football team for Gotland, an island off the east coast of Sweden. They are not affiliated with FIFA or UEFA.
Gotland is a member of the International Island Games Association and has taken part in Football at the Island Games.

Selected matches

Notable players

  Peter Öhman - national team top scorer

References

External links
List of results on Roon Ba

National football team
Gotlandic